Nicholas Hedley Foskett (born 12 March 1955) was formerly Vice-Chancellor at Keele University in Staffordshire (August 2010 – August 2015), a Professor of Education at the University of Southampton and Dean of the Faculty of Law, Arts and Social Sciences.

Biography
Born in Burslem, Stoke-on-Trent, Foskett was educated at Wolstanton Grammar School in Milehouse Lane, Newcastle-under-Lyme (now The Orme Academy). He read Geography at Keble College, Oxford before becoming a secondary school geography teacher. He was appointed senior academic administrator at Aston University in 1987, two years later he moved on to the University of Southampton as a lecturer in education, where he became a professor in 2000. In August 2010 he became Vice-Chancellor of Keele University. He is also a Trustee of Regent's University London.

Academic work
His particular areas of interest and expertise lie in the field of educational policy and management, with a particular focus on education 14-19 and higher education. Foskett also retains a strong interest in environmental issues and environmental education from his background in geography teaching, and continues to publish on aspects of the role of fieldwork and outdoor education in schools and colleges. His latest books are on educational management (Sage) and young people’s decision-making in education (Routledge Falmer) (see bibliography).

Personal life
He is married with two children.

Bibliography
Choosing Futures: Young people's decision-making in education, training and careers markets (2001), with Jane Hemsley-Brown, Routledge Falmer
Leading and Managing Education: The International Dimensions (2003), with Jacky Lumby, Paul Chapman Publishing/Sage Publications
Leading and managing education: international dimensions (2003), with Jacky Lumby,  Sage Publications
14-19 Education: Policy, Leadership and Learning (2005), with Jacky Lumby, Sage Publications
Postgraduate study in the UK: the international student's guide (2006), with Rosalind Foskett, Sage Publications

References

External links
Profile at Keele University website

People educated at Wolstanton Grammar School
Academics of the University of Southampton
Alumni of Keble College, Oxford
People associated with Aston University
Schoolteachers from Staffordshire
Living people
People from Burslem
Vice-Chancellors of Keele University
Vice-Chancellors of Bath Spa University
1955 births